Prince Street was an American cop drama that aired only two episodes in March 1997 on NBC before being cancelled.

The show premiered on a Thursday night, March 6, at 10pm ET (the time slot usually held at that time by ER) and was going to air on Wednesday nights at 10pm ET in place of the NBC drama Law & Order for a few weeks in March and April.

However, after the ratings for the show's second episode showed a very low audience, the show was quickly cancelled. Law & Order returned to its regular Wednesday night time slot three weeks later.

Premise
Based on the exploits of a real police unit in New York City formed in 1971 and operated secretly for twenty years. It was headquartered behind a print shop on Prince Street. These NYPD officers did not carry any badges, did not wear uniforms and constantly worked in disguise in order to break up some of the roughest criminal organizations in the city.

Cast
Joe Morton as Lt. Tom Warner
Vincent Spano as Det. Alex Gage
Mariska Hargitay as Det. Nina Echeverria
Lawrence Monoson as Det. Jimmy Tasio
Steven Martini as Det. Tony Libretti
Dana Eskelson as Det. Diane Hoffman

Episodes

References

External links

1997 American television series endings
1997 American television series debuts
1990s American police procedural television series
English-language television shows
NBC original programming
Television shows set in New York City
Television series by Warner Bros. Television Studios